Steindl is a surname. It may refer to:

 Andreas Steindl (b. 1989), Swiss ski mountaineer
 David Steindl-Rast (b. 1926), Catholic Benedictine monk
 Helmar Steindl (b. 1945), Austrian slalom canoer
 Imre Steindl (1839–1902), Hungarian architect
 Josef Steindl (1912–1993), Austrian-born Post-Keynesian economist
 Klaus T. Steindl (born 1966), Austrian film director
 Peter Steindl (b. 1970), head coach of the Scotland cricket team
German toponymic surnames

Surnames of Austrian origin